Vedran Turkalj (born 11 May 1988) is a Croatian football defender.

Career
Vedran Turkalj went through the ranks of Rijeka, becoming a Croatian youth international in 2005. He made his first team debut in the 2–0 home win against Pula In the end, he collected 8 appearances in the 2006–07 season, when he was still eligible to play for the U19 team. His progress was, however, marred by an injury leading to a foot operation, which caused him to miss most of the 2007–08 season. He spent two further seasons at the club, unable to fully break in the first team for similar reasons.

In the summer of 2010 he moved to the nearby Druga HNL team Pomorac Kostrena, becoming a firm first team fixture and helping the team to secure a third-place finish in the 2010–11 season and a second-place finish in the 2011–12 season. In the following seasons he became team captain as well, before moving to Solin in January 2014.

He had a spell with KA Akureyri in 2017 and in Austria in 2018.

References

External links
 

1988 births
Living people
Footballers from Rijeka
Association football central defenders
Croatian footballers
Croatia youth international footballers
HNK Rijeka players
NK Pomorac 1921 players
NK Solin players
NK Bistra players
NK Aluminij players
Knattspyrnufélag Akureyrar players
ATSV Stadl-Paura players
Croatian Football League players
First Football League (Croatia) players
Slovenian Second League players
Slovenian PrvaLiga players
Úrvalsdeild karla (football) players
Austrian Regionalliga players
Croatian expatriate footballers
Croatian expatriate sportspeople in Bosnia and Herzegovina
Expatriate footballers in Bosnia and Herzegovina
Croatian expatriate sportspeople in Slovenia
Expatriate footballers in Slovenia
Croatian expatriate sportspeople in Iceland
Expatriate footballers in Iceland
Expatriate footballers in Austria
Croatian expatriate sportspeople in Austria